A Bobohizan (Tangaa' Kadazan term) or Bobolian (Bundu Liwan Dusun term) is a high priestess, a ritual specialist and a spirit medium in Kadazan-Dusun pagan rites. The office of Bobohizan or Bobolian, is also the chief preserver of Momolianism, i.e. the philosophy and way of life of the Kadazan-Dusun people.

One of the primary roles of a Bobohizan is to appease the rice spirit Bambaazon during harvest festival or Kaamatan. During the event, she will lead a procession of people from her village through the paddy field under the full moon, to give thanks and to seek a bountiful harvest for the rice-cultivating Kadazan-Dusun people. A Bobohizan also plays a role as a mediator between the spirits and the people. One of the commonest duties of a Bobohizan is to heal and cure illnesses with herbal remedies and rites.

Origin
Bobohizan is said to stem from the first ancestors of the Kadazan-Dusun people, Kinoingan and his wife Suminundu. It is not certain whether the calling of Bobohizan (Bobolian in the Bundu-Liwan dialect) exist prior to or after the settling of the ancestors at Nunuk Ragang. Long after the first ancestors passing to Hibabou (Heaven), the rites, prayers, and incantations (Rinait or Inaait) were lost and forgotten. This is when Suminundu sent a spirit to earth to teach the people about the rinait. The spirit came every evening, calling upon anyone brave enough to learn. The call was repeated for years but no one was brave enough to come forth until one day a brave woman went out and meet the spirit in the dark. She soon learned the art of rinait and rites from the spirit and passed it on to other women in the village. According to legend, because of the woman who was brave enough to meet the spirit, all Bobohizan in Penampang was by custom, women only.

Roles 
A Bobohizan plays a pivotal role in a daily life of the Kadazan people before the advent of Christianity. This ranges from appeasing the rice spirit during 'Kaamatan and Magavau festivals, appeasing the skull spirits during the Magang celebration, appeasing and offering sacrifices to the spirits of the sacred jars (gusi) and to exorcise evil spirits. Bobohizans are also involved in charms, reading omens and to a lesser extent augury.

See also
Babaylan
Kahuna
Shamanism

References

Malaysian mythology
Magic (supernatural)
Austronesian spirituality